Globe station is an at-grade light rail station on the Blue Line of the Sacramento RT Light Rail system operated by the Sacramento Regional Transit District. The station is located in the median of Del Paso Boulevard at its intersection with Globe Avenue, after which the station is named, in the city of Sacramento, California.

South of the station, the line becomes single track and runs alongside the southbound lanes of California State Route 160 as it crosses the American River and the Sacramento Subdivision of the Union Pacific Railroad.

Altamont Corridor Express and San Joaquins services are planned to stop at a nearby Old North Sacramento station when those lines are extended to Sacramento. A new platform will be constructed along the Sacramento Subdivision by 2023 to facilitate the commuter rail and inter-city trains.

References

Sacramento Regional Transit light rail stations
Railway stations in the United States opened in 1987
1987 establishments in California
Former Western Pacific Railroad stations